Fritz Wagner (fl. 1900–1938) was an Austrian entomologist who specialised in Lepidoptera.

Fritz Wagner was an insect dealer in Vienna from 1902 to 1905 as a partner in the firm Ortner Brothers & Co. (Vienna). from 1906 to 1924, as co-proprietor of Winkler & Wagner (Vienna) and also from 1918 owner of the company Fritz Wagner.
The dealership specialised in Palaearctic especially Parnassius and Erebia and Lepidoptera of Central Asia and the Mediterranean area (collected on various personal expeditions).

Works
Partial list
Wagner, F. (1909): Einige neue Lepidopterenformen. Entomologische Zeitschrift 23 (4), pp. 17–19
 Wagner, Fritz (01. Nov 1931): Dritter (IV). Beitrag zur Lepidopteren-Fauna Inner-Anatoliens. Internationale Entomologische Zeitschrift 24(45), pp. [467-485, (47):487-493, 1 pl.
Wagner, Fritz (17 Dec 1910): Zwei neue mitteleuropäische Lepidopteren-Formen. Internationale Entomologische Zeitschrift 4(38), pp. 208–209
Wagner, Fritz (1913): Beitrag zur Kenntnis der Lepidopteren - Fauna des Iligebietes sowie des Sary-Dschas (Asia centr.). Ent. Mitt. 2, pp. [22-30, 50–62, 88–95, 112–116, 153–158, 185–190, 244–254, 285–288, 1 pl, 21 text-figs.
Wagner, Fritz (1926): Einige neue Lepidopteren-Formen meiner Sammlung. Z. öst. EntVer. 11, pp. [25-26]
Wagner, Fritz (1929): Weiterer Beitrag zur Lepidopteren-Fauna Inner-Anatoliens. Mitteilungen der Münchner Entomologischen Gesellschaft 19, pp. [1-28, 57–80, 175-206
Wagner, Fritz (27 Dec 1919): Neue Lepidopteren-Formen meiner Sammlung. Internationale Entomologische Zeitschrift 13(20), pp. 156–160

German entomologists
Year of death missing